Trifurcula silviae is a moth of the family Nepticulidae. It is known from the Alps and Prealps of south-eastern France.

The wingspan is 5.8–7 mm for males and 5.8 mm for females. Adults were collected in an alpine meadow on a steep southern slope, where Lotus corniculatus, Anthyllis vulneraria and Onobrychis montana are the most likely candidates to be its host. The species apparently occurs over a wide range of habitats, from almost lowland Mediterranean localities to high alpine country. They are on wing from June to August.

External links
Nepticulidae and Opostegidae of the world

Nepticulidae
Moths described in 1990
Moths of Europe